Joint Services Staff College may refer to: 

 Joint Services Staff College (UK), the former name of the "Joint Service Defence College"
 Joint Services Staff College (Australia), the former name of the "Centre for Defence and Strategic Studies"